Leucozonia triserialis is a species of sea snail, a marine gastropod mollusk in the family Fasciolariidae, the spindle snails, the tulip snails and their allies.

Description
The length of the shell attains 45 mm.

Distribution

References

 Crosse, H., 1865. Diagniosis Turbinellae novae. Journal de Conchyliologie 13: 316-317
 Fischer-Piette, E., 1950. Liste des types décrits dans le Journal de Conchyliologie et conservés dans la collection de ce journal (avec planches)(suite). Journal de Conchyliologie 90: 65-82
 Rolán E., 2005. Malacological Fauna From The Cape Verde Archipelago. Part 1, Polyplacophora and Gastropoda.

Fasciolariidae
Gastropods described in 1822